Top Star is a 2013 South Korean film directed, co-written and produced by veteran actor Park Joong-hoon, in his directorial debut. It stars Uhm Tae-woong as the manager of a top actor who dreams of someday becoming famous like his client, but when a twist of fate grants his wish, his life completely changes. The film premiered at the 18th Busan International Film Festival.

Plot
Tae-sik is the talent manager of top celebrity Won-joon, but he has long wanted to be an actor. He unexpectedly gets his chance when Won-joon becomes involved in a hit and run accident and Tae-sik takes the fall instead by claiming he was the driver. In exchange, Won-joon promises to give Tae-sik a small role in his next film. But Tae-sik's acting career soon takes off after he gets out of jail, and his success and stardom starts to threaten and eclipse Won-joon's. Tae-sik's popularity finally overtakes Won-joon's, but his pure passion for acting turns into greed and ego. As he loses touch with his roots, he neglects the relationships he formed on the way up. Now, in order to maintain his fame, Tae-sik will stop at nothing to stay on top.

Cast

Uhm Tae-woong as Tae-sik
Kim Min-jun as Won-joon
So Yi-hyun as Mi-na
Kim Su-ro as Choi Kang-chul
Lee Jun-hyeok as Sang-chul, Tae-sik's manager
Oh Seong-soo as Department head Jo
Jo Seok-hyun as Lee Joo-bok
Jung Gyu-soo as Kim Bong-soo
Kang Sung-jin as Reporter Park
Kim Jin-geun as Director Kim Sung-cheol
Go Eun-yi as Mapo queen
Woo Ki-hong as Director Jung Chang-min
Kim Ki-cheon as Parking warden
Kang Ku-hyun as Assistant cameraman
Moon Jeong-soo as Department head Park
Yu Ji-yeon as Attorney Lee
Yang Myeong-heon as Attorney Hong
Park Hee-geon as young Tae-sik 
Kim Tae-min as young Sang-chul
Joo Min-ha as Entertainment Tonight reporter
Kim Dong-hyeon as Entertainment Tonight producer
Kim Min-seung as Detective at Jeongdongjin police substation
Bae Jung-sik as Detective 1
Kim Yong-jin as Detective 2
Kim Tae-hyun as Lover of young Kim Bong-soo
Lee Seung-won as Wine bar manager
Lee Seung-ha as Actress in Into the Wind
Hong Ji-young as Host of Into the Wind stage greeting 
Ji-woo as Won-joon's male junior colleague
Kang Ji-hye as Won-joon's female junior colleague 1
Park Ah-in as Won-joon's female junior colleague 2
Kang Ji-hye as Fan club president
Kim Hye-ri  as Female student
Lee Yeong-hoon as Song of the Sun gunman 2
Jo Myeong-haeng as Song of the Sun butcher 2
Kwon Hoe-su as Song of the Sun butcher 3
Choi Seong-gyeom as Song of the Sun butcher 5
Lee Soo-in as Reporter Lee
Lee Geum-hee as Host of Today's Critics Awards
Kim Sung-kyung as News anchor 1
Han Soo-jin as News anchor 2
Ahn Sung-ki as Kim Kyung-min (cameo)
Uhm Jung-hwa as herself, presenter at the Blue Dragon Film Awards (cameo)
Nam Gyu-ri as Actress in Ice Flower (cameo)
Ryoo Seung-wan as Director of Ice Flower (cameo)
Lee Hyun-seung as Director Choi (cameo)
Jo Seon-mook as Kyung-min's manager (cameo)
Kim Kwang-sik as Cinematographer (cameo)
Kim Gu-taek as Director Gu Tae-jin (cameo)

Remake
Chinese production company Aim Media bought the remake rights in 2014.

References

External links
 

2013 films
South Korean drama films
2010s Korean-language films
2010s South Korean films